Nemapogon arcosuensis is a moth of the family Tineidae. It is found on Sardinia.

The wingspan is 12–14 mm. The forewings are white with a black pattern. The hindwings are grey.

Etymology
The species is named for Oasi WWF Monte Arcosu, the collecting locality.

References

Moths described in 2007
Nemapogoninae